Meta bourneti is an orb weaving cave spider closely related to Meta menardi.

Morphology 
Big sized spider (body length male: 10–13 mm; female: 13–16 mm), very similar in the external morphology to the congeneric Meta menardi. The prosoma is red-brown, with darker margin. Legs are red-brown. The opisthosoma is yellowish, laterally often completely black.

Ecology 
Usually found in caves, in the twilight-zone. The species show a preference for cave walls and roofs, where it spin its orb-web. M. bourneti is able to consume a wide variety of prey items, including dipterans, moths, centipedes, woodlouse, and other cave-dwelling spiders.

Phenology 
Female and juveniles are observed all year round. Males are rare, and usually found from August to December.

The eggsac (cocoon) is white, drop-shaped, and very similar to that of M. menardi (see ). It is usually laid in the proximity of the cave entrance between October and November. The spiderlings hatch from the cocoon between January and February.

Distribution 
It is found from Europe to Georgia and North Africa.

References 

Tetragnathidae
Spiders of Europe
Spiders of Africa
Spiders of Georgia (country)
Spiders described in 1922
Cave spiders